The Philadelphia Tapers were an American professional basketball team that played a partial 1962–1963 season in the American Basketball League (1961–62). It traces its history to the 1950s AAU New York Tapers.

AAU New York Tapers

Originally the amateur New York Tapers, the team played in the NABL and was sponsored by Technical Tape Corporation, makers of Tuck brand adhesive and recording tapes. The Tapers were a top AAU club team in the 1950s featuring many former collegiate stars and pro players.

Washington Tapers 1961–1962
The American Basketball League played one full season, 1961–1962, and part of the next season until the league folded on December 31, 1962. The ABL was the first basketball league to have a three point shot for baskets scored far away from the goal. Other rules that set the league apart were a 30-second shooting clock and a wider free throw lane, 18 feet instead of the standard 12.

The American Basketball League was formed when Abe Saperstein did not get the Los Angeles National Basketball Association (NBA) franchise he sought. His Harlem Globetrotters had strong NBA ties.  When Minneapolis Lakers owner Bob Short was permitted to move the Lakers to Los Angeles, Saperstein reacted by convincing National Alliance of Basketball Leagues (NABL) team owner Paul Cohen (Tuck Tapers) and Amateur Athletic Union (AAU) National Champion Cleveland Pipers owner George Steinbrenner to take the top NABL and AAU teams and players and form a rival league.

League franchises were: the Chicago Majors (1961-1963); Cleveland Pipers (1961-1962); Kansas City Steers (1961-1963); Long Beach Chiefs (1961-1963), as Hawaii Chiefs in 1961-62; Los Angeles Jets (1961-1962) — disbanded during season); Oakland Oaks (1961-1963), as San Francisco Saints in 1961-62; Philadelphia Tapers (1961-1963), as Washington Tapers in 1961-62 — moved to New York during 1961-62 season, as New York Tapers; and the Pittsburgh Rens (1961-1963).

When Saperstein's American Basketball League (1961–62) was born in 1961, Tuck Tape owner Paul Cohen purchased a franchise, gave it the Tapers name, and placed it in Washington, D.C. (playing at the Washington Coliseum). Cohen signed Gene Conley, who had played for the Boston Celtics and pitched for the Milwaukee Braves. While with the Tapers, Conley often accompanied Paul Cohen on sales calls for his Tuck Tape Company.

The team was a failure in Washington, and Cohen transplanted the franchise mid-season — on January 2, 1962 — to Commack, New York, renaming it the New York Tapers. They played their final game in New York at Long Island Arena on March 14, 1962.

Philadelphia Tapers 1962–1963

When the ABL began their second season in 1962, the Tapers moved to Philadelphia, where Cohen hoped to take advantage of the NBA Philadelphia Warriors' (and Wilt Chamberlain’s) departure to San Francisco. Harvey Pollack kept the Tapers' statistics as he had for the Warriors. The Tapers hired Mario Perri to coach the team in Philadelphia. Perri had been the athletic director at the Technical Tape Corp where he coached the softball team to a national title.

In a bizarre bit of scheduling, the team twice faced the Chicago Majors on November 15, winning the first game, 51-46, before dropping the nightcap, 65-63, in overtime. The Tapers played only 28 games during the abbreviated 1962–1963 season. The final game was against the Chicago Majors in a neutral site game at the Cleveland Arena on December 30, 1962.

Players

During their time, the Tapers boasted of many outstanding players.

Star of the team was Georgia Tech Yellow Jackets guard Roger Kaiser, who later became an outstanding college coach at West Georgia College and Life College.

Another star was 6'10" center Bill Chmielewski, out of the University of Dayton.  In 1964, he was selected in the NBA draft by the Cincinnati Royals, but never played in the NBA.

Also starring on the team was the mysterious Sylvester Blye, a strapping 6-9 player who saw his college career at Seattle University quashed after one game when officials discovered that he had been playing professionally for the touring Harlem Clowns. Blye then went to work for Tuck Tape and became the team's signature player. He was known as a legend in the New York Rucker league and was a full-fledged star in the ABL, but no NBA team ever called on him after the league's demise.

Another notable Taper was point guard Cleo Hill, who was a superstar at Winston-Salem State University several years prior to Earl Monroe. Hill was a number one draft pick of the NBA St. Louis Hawks but was mysteriously cut a year later. His stay with the Tapers also did not result in a call by any NBA teams, which Hill attributed to racism. In fact, NBA teams at the time largely subscribed to an unwritten code that limited black players on the rosters and generally saw (at most) two black players start at home and three on the road. Reserve players at the time were almost all white.

ABL Year-by-year

References

External links
Just Sports Stats: Philadelphia Tapers

American Basketball League (1961–62) teams
Basketball teams in New York (state)
Basketball teams in Philadelphia
Basketball teams in Washington, D.C.
Defunct basketball teams in Pennsylvania
1961 establishments in Washington, D.C.
1962 disestablishments in Pennsylvania
Basketball teams established in 1961
Sports clubs disestablished in 1962